Brooklyn Station, Terminus Cosmos is volume ten in the French comic book (or bande dessinée) science fiction series Valérian and Laureline created by writer Pierre Christin and artist Jean-Claude Mézières.

Synopsis
Valérian wakes up in a hotel room next to the blonde woman he met at the end of Métro Châtelet, Direction Cassiopeia. He has been roused by Laureline using their telepathic link. She explains that Albert had become concerned at Valérian's disappearance some days previously and, unable to locate him, had resorted to contacting Galaxity via the space-time relay. Galaxity had then passed on the message to Laureline who used the link to contact him. Valérian, embarrassed, explains that he has been enjoying himself with the woman, who is called Cynthia Westerly. Laureline tells Valérian that Albert is certain that Cynthia is an agent of W.A.A.M.

Laureline, meanwhile, has found out more about what happened on Zomuk when the four elements were stolen. A magnificent spacecraft had landed on Zomuk near the sanctuary and two figures emerged claiming to be the gods the Zoms worshiped. Believing them, the Zoms took them to the sanctuary and presented them with the four elements. Each "god" took two of the elements but their separation seemed to cause the two "gods" to fight amongst themselves. When, during the fight, one of the "gods" dropped a disintegrator rifle, the Zoms realised they were being deceived – but too late: the spacecraft, now carrying the four elements, took off. Analyzing the disintegrator, Laureline determines that it was manufactured on one of the asteroids of the Elsinn Belt, a known hideout for space pirates. She decides to head there to see what she can find.

The next morning, in Paris, while having breakfast in the hotel, Cynthia receives a call. Eavesdropping, Valérian learns that the next manifestation will be at Beaubourg. Returning to the table, Cynthia makes an excuse that she is meeting an aunt at the airport and can't stay with Valérian. When she leaves, Valérian telephones Albert and they agree to meet at Beaubourg. Cynthia emerges from the hotel and gets into her car observed by agents of Bellson & Gambler. They see Valérian follow her and pull up pretending to be a taxi. Cynthia meets her associates in the plaza in front of the Pompidou Centre while Valérian finds Albert. They look around the plaza trying to find the manifestation. Suddenly Albert spots an old homeless woman with a magnificent blue bird. The W.A.A.M. representatives also suspect something and offer the woman money in exchange for the bird. Valérian surprises Cynthia and in the confusion snatches the bird from the old woman. He dashes into the Pompidou Centre with it where the bird suddenly grows and become enveloped in a blue fire. Valérian opens fire with his rifle and destroys the apparition but not before it strikes him with a tongue of fire. Somewhat dazed and disoriented, he rejoins Albert in the underground car park. Taking the car to the airport, Valérian is bombarded with visions of alien worlds and of the future.

The visions continue all throughout their flight to New York where they are greeted by another friend of Albert's, Schlomo Melsheim, one of the greatest authorities on the Kabbalah. Schlomo brings them to his home in Brooklyn where his wife tends to Valérian. Schlomo tells Albert that he had been approached by representatives of Bellson & Gambler seeking his assistance. The company had been contacted by an alien force via their computer promising sales demonstrations of new energy technologies unknown on Earth. At the same time, W.A.A.M. had also received a similar approach. Both companies employed experts from a myriad of disciplines including many mystical gurus such as medicine men, astrologers, alchemists, parapsychologists and ufologists.

A final demonstration has been organised on some waste-ground in Brooklyn and Schlomo drives Valérian and Albert there. Albert disguises himself with a false beard. Many representatives of Bellson & Gambler are present including Jeremiah Bellson, the co-founder of the company himself. Schlomo has managed to gain access to the meeting though Bellson's lover, Sarah Friedlander, an old acquaintance. Sarah introduces them to Bellson with Schlomo claiming that Albert is an expert on Zohar and Valérian is his assistant. From Bellson's car, they observe that representatives of W.A.A.M. have also turned up for the demonstration. Valérian, still feeling unwell, excuses himself and tries to regain contact with Laureline.

Laureline explains that she has found the two, Crocbattler and Rackalust, who stole the elements from the Zoms in the Elsinn Belt – they are hiding out in an abandoned fortress on one of the asteroids where they have been squabbling non-stop since their successful raid. In conjunction with a criminal gang on Rubanis, and possibly manipulated by the mysterious aliens of the planet Hypsis, they conspired to steal the elements and sell them to the highest bidder on Earth.

As Laureline explains the situation to Valérian, all four elemental forces manifest themselves in Brooklyn and begin to wreak havoc. The observers from Bellson & Gambler and W.A.A.M. look on, helpless. Laureline acts quickly – dressed in an alluring costume she convinces Crocbattler and Rackalust to engage in a duel with the four elements and Laureline herself as the prize. Consumed with lust they agree and end up shooting and killing each other. Drawing her gun, Laureline destroys the four elements. At that moment the manifestations disappear. All the observers have fled except for Valérian, Albert and Schlomo. Jeremiah Bellson is the last to leave in his car accompanied by the founder of W.A.A.M. with whom he is discussing a joint venture. Valérian bids them farewell and makes for the Statue of Liberty where he uses the spatio-temporal relay station there to return home and face Laureline for his indiscretion.

Main characters
 Valérian, a spatio-temporal agent from Galaxity, future capital of Earth, in the 28th century
 Laureline, originally from France in the 11th century, now a spatio-temporal agent of Galaxity in the 28th century
 Mr Albert, Galaxity's contact in 20th century Earth
 Cynthia Westerly, an employee of W.A.A.M.
 Schlomo Melsheim, a Hasidic Jew from Brooklyn, the world's foremost authority on the Kabbalah, especially the texts of Zohar and Ba'al Shamîm.
 Chaya, wife of Schlomo Melsheim, an expert in lost knowledge of healing
 Sarah Friedlander, a mutual acquaintance of Schlomo Melsheim and Jeremiah Bellson
 Jeremiah Bellson, surviving co-founder of the multinational Bellson & Gambler
 Crocbattler and Rackalust, thieves and con-men from the Elsinn Belt in Cassiopeia
 Unnamed employees of the multinationals Bellson & Gambler and W.A.A.M.

Settings
 Earth, year 1980. Valérian and Albert travel to the following as part of their investigation:
 Paris, France. Cynthia is staying at the Hotel Plaza Athénée on Avenue Montaigne on the Right Bank. The fourth manifestation occurs at the Centre Georges Pompidou in the Beaubourg area. Valérian and Albert leave France by air from Roissy (Charles de Gaulle) Airport.
 New York, United States. Valérian and Albert arrive at Kennedy Airport and travel to Schlomo Melsheim's house in Brooklyn. The appearance of the four elements takes place on waste ground elsewhere in Brooklyn. Valérian returns to Galaxity via the spatio-temporal relay station located beneath the Statue of Liberty.
 Constellation of Cassiopeia. Continuing her investigation, Laureline visits the following planets:
 Zomuk. See entry for Métro Châtelet, Direction Cassiopeia.
 Elsinn. A gas giant surrounded by a vast belt of asteroids. It is the home to the hideouts of many criminals including:
 The Rapolink Sect – a group of misogynists who have sworn to hunt down and kill any females who come into their vicinity.
 Pirates who disable any passing ships by teletransportation of rocks.
 Space dogs.
 Various brothels that serve the needs of the low-lifes that live in the Elsinn Belt
 The asteroid with an ancient fortress where Laureline finds Crocbattler and Rackalust.

Notes
 There are two references in this album to the adventure The City of Shifting Waters — the character of Sun Rae makes a cameo appearance in plate 31, frame 9; and Valérian mentions that adventure as he leaves Albert and Schlomo and returns to Galaxity via the spatio-temporal relay station located in the Statue of Liberty.
 This album marks the first references to the mysterious planet of Hypsis – first it appears as one of Valérian's visions of the future when he is affected by the element of Air and secondly Laureline suggests that it is the Hypsis that manipulated Crocbattler and Rackalust, as well as their contacts on Rubanis, to steal the elements and try to sell them to Earth – foreshadowing the events of The Ghosts of Inverloch and The Rage of Hypsis.
 This is the only adventure in which Valérian and Laureline never physically meet.
 There is a certain similarity between the outfit Laureline wears to attract Crocbattler and Rackalust and the "Queen of Sin" costume Emma Peel wears in The Avengers episode "A Touch of Brimstone"
 This story, involving supernatural powers drawn from representations of the four elements, bears some similarities to the 1997 Luc Besson film The Fifth Element on which Jean-Claude Mézières worked as a conceptual artist. While the Valérian series is certainly an influence on the film, it is not known to what extent the plot was influenced by this album and Métro Châtelet, Direction Cassiopeia. Besson claims that he first came up with the idea for the film at the age of 16 which would pre-date the publication of these albums.

1981 graphic novels
Valérian and Laureline